Catinella  may refer to:
 Catinella (gastropod), a genus of small air-breathing land snails in the family Succineidae
 Catinella (fungus),  a genus of fungi in the class Dothideomycetes